Celestial Observatory  is an astronomical observatory owned and operated by Arkansas Tech University.  It is located in Russellville, Arkansas (US).

See also 
List of observatories

References

External links
 Arkansas Tech University Astronomical Observatory Clear Sky Clock Forecasts of observing conditions.

Astronomical observatories in Arkansas
Buildings and structures in Russellville, Arkansas
Arkansas Tech University